The Swedish film industry produced over six hundred feature films in 2014. This article fully lists all non-pornographic films, including short films, that had a release date in that year and which were at least partly made by the Sweden. It does not include films first released in previous years that had release dates in 2014.  Also included is an overview of the major events in Swedish film, including film festivals and awards ceremonies, as well as lists of those films that have been particularly well received, both critically and financially.

Major Releases

Notable Deaths

See also

 2014 in film
 2014 in Sweden
 Cinema of Sweden
 List of Swedish submissions for the Academy Award for Best Foreign Language Film

References

External links

Swedish
Films
2014